The Darjah Utama Temasek is Singapore's second most prestigious national honour and was instituted in 1962. It is an Order conferred by the President of Singapore only to citizens of Singapore. It may be awarded to non-citizens only under special circumstances. 

As of 29 July 2019, the Order has three different grades:

 the Order of Temasek (With High Distinction), 
 the Order of Temasek (With Distinction), and 
 the Order of Temasek.

The rules of award state that no more than 12 people (other than people admitted in an honorary capacity) may be admitted to the Order of Temasek (With High Distinction) at any one time. As of August 2020, there are currently 8 people in the Order of Temasek (With High Distinction). There is no limit to the number of people admitted to the other two grades.

History 
The Order was first instituted in 1962. It was then the most important national honour. The Order would have only twelve members, with Yang di-Pertuan Negara conferring the membership on advice from the Prime Minister. A chancellor would be appointed by the Yang di-Pertuan Negara from among the members of the order, who would hold the seal of the order. Any warrants issued by order would be countersigned by both chancellor and the Yang di-Pertuan Negara.

The Order became the second most important national honour in 1970, when the Bintang Temasek (the Star of Temasek) was created and ranked over all other orders and medals.

The rules governing the order was since revised several times. Gazette notices establishing the Rules that instituted the Order were published in 1975, 1996 and 2019. The 1996 Rules would revoke the 1975 Rules. With the 1996 Rules, there would be 3 grades of the Order, First Class, Second Class and Third Class. Only Singapore citizens could be admitted to the Order, with non-Singapore citizens being admitted in an honorary capacity. The First Class grade would have a limited capacity of twelve members, whilst the other grades have no such restriction. The Seal of the Order would bear the design of the Badge.

Members would be distinguished by the positions of the Badge and Star of the Order on their attire. Members of First Class grade would have their Badge worn the right hip from a sash passing over the left shoulder and under the right arm, and their Star worn on the left side of their outer garment. Members of Second Class grade would have their Badge worn suspended round the neck from a ribbon, and their Star is to be worn on the left side of their outer garment. Members of Third Class grade would only have the Badge of the Order, and it is to be worn suspended round the neck from a ribbon.

Ordinarily, only Singapore citizens could be admitted to the Order, but in special circumstances non-Singapore citizens may also be admitted in an honorary capacity.

In 2019, the 1996 Rules was amended to update the nomenclature of the grades of the Order. The grades would be known as:

 the Order of Temasek (With High Distinction),
 the Order of Temasek (With Distinction), and
 the Order of Temasek.

The updated nomenclature would also be retrospectively applied on members conferred under the previous nomenclature.

Recipients

References

External links
 

1962 establishments in Singapore
 
Civil awards and decorations of Singapore